Sister Wives is an American reality television series broadcast on TLC that premiered on September 26, 2010. The show documents the life of a polygamist family, which includes Kody Brown, his wife Robyn, ex-wives (Meri, Janelle, Christine), and their 18 children. The family began the series living in Lehi, Utah, moved to Las Vegas in 2011, and to Flagstaff, Arizona, in mid-2018.

Brown and his four wives have stated they participated in the show to make the public aware of polygamist families and to combat societal prejudices. Brown argues that his polygamist arrangement is legal because he is married (legally) to only one woman (Meri, then later Robyn), while the other marriages are "spiritual unions".

Background

The show follows the lives of Kody Brown, wife Robyn, ex-wives (Meri, Janelle, Christine), and their 18 children. In the first season, the show televised Kody's courting of and marriage to his fourth wife, Robyn, in 2010. Robyn was the first new wife to enter the family in 16 years.

The crews continued to film them after the marriage in case the series was picked up for a second season. Sister Wives was publicly introduced on August 6, 2010, at the Television Critics Association summer media tour in Beverly Hills. The series' first episode, an hour-long, was broadcast on TLC on September 26, 2010, and the first season continued with six half-hour episodes until October 17, 2010.

The broadcast of Sister Wives came at a time when polygamy and multiple marriages were prevalent topics in American pop culture. Big Love, the hit HBO series about fictional Utah polygamist Bill Henrickson, his three sister wives, and their struggle to gain acceptance in society, had already been on the air for several years. In early September 2010, the drama series Lone Star, about a con man on the verge of entering into multiple marriages, premiered on Fox but was quickly canceled after two episodes. When Sister Wives debuted, actress Katherine Heigl was in the process of developing a film about Carolyn Jessop, a woman who fled from a polygamist sect.

In October 2010, TLC announced it had commissioned a second season, which began in March 2011. A TLC interview with the Brown family was broadcast on October 31, 2010, and a one-hour program featuring the honeymoon of Kody and Robyn aired on November 22, 2010.

The series led to the Brown family being investigated for possible prosecution. The family later sued the state of Utah, challenging its criminal polygamy laws. The Browns prevailed in the district court in a 2013 ruling, but a unanimous three-judge panel of the U.S. Court of Appeals for the Tenth Circuit ordered the case to be dismissed on standing grounds in 2016.

Episodes

Reception

Critical reception

Sister Wives drew national media attention after its first season and garnered generally mixed reviews from critics. Washington Post staff writer Hank Stuever called it "refreshingly frank" and found most interesting the small details of the family's everyday life, such as the food supply, division of labor, and minor arguments. Los Angeles Times television critic Mary McNamara said she was intrigued by the matriarchal nature of the polygamist family, a unit that is traditionally considered patriarchal. McNamara said the wives form the center of the family and that "their bonds appear far stronger and more vital than the casual fondness with which they all treat Kody". Salon writer Schuyler Velasco praised Sister Wives for introducing viewers to the unfamiliar subject matter and called it "refreshingly modest" considering its controversial topic. Velasco said it has "a natural, honest presence in a genre fabled for the camera-hogging antics of Jersey Shore". Shelley Fralic of The Vancouver Sun called it fascinating and surprising and was impressed with the sensible and articulate way in which the family defended their lifestyle. When the Brown family made an October 2010 appearance on The Oprah Winfrey Show, talk show host Oprah Winfrey said she found particularly fascinating the relationship between the sister wives.

Mark A. Perigard of the Boston Herald criticized Kody Brown for opening himself and his family up to potential criminal prosecution by appearing in the series, describing him as "a lawbreaker who is risking himself and the family he claims is so precious just to star in his own TV show". Elizabeth Tenety of The Washington Post called the series "one part domestic drudgery, another part sensationalism" and claimed it relied on a "familiar reality TV recipe" shared by other TLC series such as 19 Kids and Counting and Kate Plus 8. Religion Dispatches writer Joanna Brooks shared Tenety's perspective, criticizing the show for presenting polygamy in a manner that "is about as interesting to me as Kate Gosselin's latest makeover." In this vein Brooks criticized the show for not engaging the theology of plural marriage and for letting Kody Brown's superficial comments about the dissimilarity of Fundamentalist and mainstream Mormonism pass onto the viewers without any critical scrutiny or added nuance. Shari Puterman, television columnist with the Asbury Park Press, felt the sister wives had issues with jealousy and self-worth, and she compared Kody to a cult leader. Puterman added, "I can't speak for everyone, but I believe in the sanctity of marriage. It's sad to see that TLC's capitalizing on people who don't." Former prosecutor and television personality Nancy Grace criticized the show and said she believed Kody Brown should go to jail, but she expressed doubt he would, based on Utah's history of overlooking polygamy. Christine Seifert, an associate professor of communications at Westminster College in Salt Lake City, said the show could give viewers who are unfamiliar with the LDS church the incorrect assumption that polygamy is accepted by the mainstream church. Several commentators have taken notice of the fact that the family's religious convictions are downplayed in Sister Wives.

Ratings
According to Nielsen Media Research, the September 26, 2010, one-hour premiere episode of Sister Wives drew 2.26 million viewers, a strong rating for the network. It marked the biggest series debut for TLC since Cake Boss launched in 2009 and was a stronger rating than any of the season premieres for HBO's Big Love. The remaining episodes of the first season were each half an hour long, with two broadcasts together each Thursday. In the second week, the first episode drew 1.88 million viewers, while the second drew 2.13 million. The third week drew similar results, with 1.89 million viewers watching the first episode and 2.05 million watching the second. Sister Wives drew its strongest ratings during the fourth and final week of the first season, with 2.67 million viewers for the first episode and 2.74 million for the season finale. As a result of the 2.7 million average viewership for the two episodes, TLC ranked first among all ad-support cable channels in the 18–49 and 25–54 age groups. The series drew double- and triple-digit rating gains in all key demographics and ranked second in ad-supported cable network shows during its timeslot.

Litigation
Kody Brown, along with his wives, filed a legal case in the United States federal courts challenging the State of Utah's criminal polygamy law. The Browns prevailed in a 2013 federal district court ruling, but a unanimous three-judge panel of the U.S. Court of Appeals for the Tenth Circuit ordered the case to be dismissed on standing grounds in 2016. The Tenth Circuit concluded that, because local Utah prosecutors had a policy of not pursuing most polygamy cases in the absence of additional associated crimes (e.g., welfare fraud or marriage of underage persons), the Browns had no credible fear of future prosecution and thus lacked standing.

Dissolution of relationships
As polygamous marriage is not legally recognized in the US, there are no divorce documents to date the end of relationships. The end of a relationship is instead reckoned by announcements, and events such as moving away.

In November 2021, Christine announced the dissolution of her relationship with Kody. Christine sold her Flagstaff home in October 2021, and in August 2022 transferred ownership of a portion of jointly-owned "Coyote Pass" property in Flagstaff to Kody and Robyn Brown. On Valentine's Day 2023, Christine publicly announced her relationship with new boyfriend David Woolley.

In December 2022, Janelle announced her separation from Kody.

Meri's marriage was known to be the most rocky of all, and has been since the beginning of the show. It had been previously called non-sexual relationship rather than a usual marriage for a while. Following Christine and Janelle's divorces, rumors began that Meri was next. On January 10, 2023, Meri and Kody posted joint social media announcements that they decided to end their marriage. Meri also condemned a December 2022 article in People Magazine for incorrectly quoting her saying it was over before it was.

Associated works

Becoming Sister Wives
In 2013 the parents jointly published a book titled Becoming Sister Wives: The Story of an Unconventional Marriage.

Cooking with Christine
Following Christine's divorce, TLC gave her a show of her own titled Cooking with Just Christine.

Gwendlyn Brown's YouTube
In 2022, Gwendlyn Brown created  and started making reaction videos to season 17 episodes.

See also
 Polygamy in North America
 My Five Wives, a reality TV series on TLC about a polygamist Mormon fundamentalist family
 Seeking Sister Wife, a reality TV series on TLC about polygamists
 Uthando Nes’thembu, a South African reality TV series on Mzansi Magic about a polygamist Zulu family
 Escaping Polygamy, a reality TV series on A&E about a polygamist Mormon fundamentalist communities

References

Bibliography

External links
 
 Puddle Monkey, production company
 
 

2010 American television series debuts
2010s American reality television series
2020s American reality television series
English-language television shows
Participants in American reality television series
TLC (TV network) original programming
Mormon fundamentalism
People from Lehi, Utah
Mormonism and polygamy
Television shows set in Utah
Television shows set in the Las Vegas Valley
Works about Mormon fundamentalism
Television series about families
Television series about polygamy
Polygamy in the United States
Mormonism and women
Women in Utah
Women in Nevada
Women in Arizona